Camih Epiphanie Gantin; is a beauty pageant titleholder who was crowned Miss Togo 2012.

Early life
Gantin is a third year student of Economics & International Finance

Miss Togo 2012
Miss Epiphany, Camih Gantin has been crowned Miss Togo 2012 by Handlos Quizi (Miss Togo 2011) at the 18th edition of Miss Togo beauty pageant which was held in Lome on Saturday night of 1 September 2012.

References

Living people
Togolese beauty pageant winners
Year of birth missing (living people)
21st-century Togolese women